9P or 9-P may refer to:

Science and technology
 9P (protocol), a network protocol developed for the Plan 9 from Bell Labs distributed operating system
 9P, NASA code for Progress M1-9
 9p, an arm of Chromosome 9 (human)
 9P/Tempel; see Tempel 1
 Monosomy 9p, a chromosomal disorder due to deletion
 Tetrasomy 9p, a genetic disease due to inclusion

Engineering
 9P, a variant of Salmson 9
 9P, a model of AIM-9 Sidewinder
 GCR Class 9P, a class of British 4-6-0 steam locomotive
 Yak-9P, a model of Yakovlev Yak-9

Other uses
 New York State Route 9P

See also
 P9 (disambiguation)